Zicavo is a commune in the Corse-du-Sud department of France on the island of Corsica.

Population

Notable people
Jacques Pierre Abbatucci (minister) (1791-1857)

See also
Communes of the Corse-du-Sud department

References

Communes of Corse-du-Sud
Corse-du-Sud communes articles needing translation from French Wikipedia